Triopasites is a genus of cuckoo bees in the family Apidae. There are at least two described species in Triopasites.

Species
These two species belong to the genus Triopasites:
 Triopasites penniger (Cockerell, 1894)
 Triopasites spinifera Rozen, 1997

References

Further reading

 
 

Nomadinae